To Tell the Truth is an American television panel show in which four celebrity panelists are presented with three contestants (the "team of challengers", each an individual or pair) and must identify which is the "central character" whose unusual occupation or experience has been read aloud by the show's moderator/host. When the panelists question the contestants, the two impostors may lie whereas the "central character" must tell the truth. The setup adds the impostor element to the format of What's My Line? and I've Got a Secret.

The show was created by Bob Stewart and originally produced by Mark Goodson–Bill Todman Productions. It aired—both on the CBS television network, from 1956 to 1968, and in syndication, from 1969 to 1978—and has been revived several times since then, reaching a total of 31 seasons by 2021. The original host was Bud Collyer, who hosted the show during its CBS years from 1956 to 1968. He was replaced by Garry Moore when the show moved to syndication in 1969, and stayed the host into 1977, though Moore's health trouble resulted in a number of guest hosts during his tenure, and led to his eventual retirement, to be replaced on a permanent basis as host by Joe Garagiola, a former panelist and frequent guest host. Garagiola hosted until the show was cancelled in 1978.

Robin Ward hosted a 1980–1981 syndicated revival of the program, and a 1990–1991 revival on the NBC network featured a succession of different hosts - Gordon Elliott, Lynn Swann and Alex Trebek. The show was revived again in syndication from 2000 to 2002 and hosted by John O'Hurley. The most recent iteration is now on the ABC network and has been hosted by Anthony Anderson since 2016.

Basic rules
Although there have been some variations in the rules over the years (including the addition of a secondary game in some versions), certain basic aspects have remained consistent throughout all versions of To Tell the Truth. Three challengers are introduced, all claiming to be the central character. The announcer typically asks the challengers, who stand side by side, "What is your name, please?" Each challenger then states, "My name is [central character's name]." The celebrity panelists then read along as the host reads aloud a signed affidavit about the central character.

The panelists are each given a period of time to question the challengers. Questions are directed to the challengers by number (designated "Number One," "Number Two" and "Number Three"), with the central character sworn to give truthful answers, and the impostors permitted to lie and pretend to be the central character.

After questioning is complete, each member of the panel votes on which of the challengers he or she believes to be the central character, either by writing the number on a card or holding up a card with the number of their choice, without consulting the other panelists. Any panelist who knows one of the challengers or has another unfair advantage is required to recuse or disqualify themselves, which, for scoring purposes, is counted as an incorrect vote. They would also sit out of the questioning.

Once the votes are in, the host asks, "Will the real [person's name] please stand up?" The central character then stands, often after some brief playful feinting and false starts among all three challengers. Occasionally, the central character would be asked to do something else related to his or her story instead of standing up. The two impostors then reveal their real names and their actual occupations. Prize money is awarded and divided among all three of the challengers, based on the number of incorrect votes received by the impostors.

History

1956–1968, CBS
To Tell the Truth was to have premiered on Tuesday, December 18, 1956, on CBS in primetime as Nothing But The Truth, but the program title was changed to To Tell the Truth the day before the show's debut. (There was one pilot episode titled "Nothing But The Truth"; both the planned and eventual titles derive from the standard English court oath "to tell the truth, the whole truth, and nothing but the truth.")

The series was recorded in New York City, initially at Studio 54, before moving to the Ed Sullivan Theater late in its run. The existence of an audience ticket for a taping indicates that the show originated in color at the CBS Broadcast Center in late 1966.

Bud Collyer was the show's host (Mike Wallace hosted the pilot); recurring panelists by the 1960s included Tom Poston, Peggy Cass, Orson Bean, and Kitty Carlisle. (Cass and Carlisle stayed on as panelists for most subsequent editions.) Earlier regular panelists included Johnny Carson, Polly Bergen, Jayne Meadows, Don Ameche, Hy Gardner, Dick Van Dyke, Faye Emerson, Hildy Parks, John Cameron Swayze, Betty White, and Ralph Bellamy. Bern Bennett, Collyer's announcer on Beat the Clock, was the inaugural announcer of To Tell the Truth in the 1950s. Upon Bennett's transfer to CBS's Los Angeles studios, Johnny Olson, who in time became the best-known of all Goodson–Todman Productions announcers, joined the show in 1960 and remained with the show until 1972.

On the pilot and the primetime run, three games were played per episode. For the pilot, a wrong vote from each of the four-member panel and one wrong vote derived from the majority vote of the audience (a total of five votes) paid $300, the total prize money divided among the three challengers. The studio audience also voted, with the majority vote counting equally with that of one by a celebrity panelist; thus, the maximum of five incorrect votes resulted in $1,500 divided among the challengers. If there was a tie for the highest vote from the audience, and for each panelist who was disqualified, a wrong vote was counted. There was no consolation prize for no wrong votes.

For the majority of the primetime run there was no audience vote, thus each wrong vote from the four-member panel paid $250, divided among the three challengers, for a possible $1,000 for a complete stump of four wrong answers. A consolation prize of $150 was awarded and divided among the three challengers if there were no wrong votes. For each panelist who was disqualified, a wrong vote was counted. A design element in the set for this series was a platform situated directly above and behind the emcee's desk. The contestants stood on this platform during their introduction, allowing the camera to pan directly down to the host. They then traveled down a curved staircase to the main stage level to play the game. Some subsequent versions would use a variation of the original set design; others did not and had all the action at floor level.

On Monday, June 18, 1962, a daytime five-day-per-week edition was introduced, running at 3 p.m. Eastern Time. The daytime show, also hosted by Collyer, featured a separate panel for its first three years, with actress Phyllis Newman as the only regular. The evening panel took over the afternoon show in 1965; in early 1968, Bert Convy replaced Poston in the first chair.

The daytime show was reduced to two games to accommodate a five-minute CBS news bulletin towards the half-hour mark. On the CBS daytime run, each wrong vote paid the three challengers $100 for a possible total of $400 divided among the three challengers for a "complete stump" of all four wrong votes. If all the votes were correct, the challengers split a consolation prize of $75. During the show's final year and a half, the studio audience also voted, with the majority vote counting equally with that of one of the celebrity panelists, thus a maximum of $500 divided among the challengers could be awarded for the maximum five incorrect votes. If there was a tie for the highest vote from the audience, and for each panelist who was disqualified, a wrong vote was counted. The audience vote was utilized on the nighttime show for its final six episodes (increasing the maximum possible payout to $1,250).

One CBS daytime episode featuring Dorothy Kilgallen, best known as a regular panelist on What's My Line?, was broadcast in the Eastern, Central, and Mountain time zones on Monday, November 8, 1965, as news of her sudden death was circulated by wire services. The breaking news story prompted CBS newscaster Douglas Edwards to announce her death immediately after the episode ended. She had videotaped the program six days earlier, according to the New York Herald Tribune. The newspaper added that Kilgallen and Arlene Francis both pretended to be Joan Crawford while sitting next to the real Crawford in a celebrity segment that the daytime series featured regularly starting in 1965. The episode was one of the large majority of To Tell the Truth daytime episodes that were destroyed because of the common practice of wiping videotape for reuse, prior to the development of less expensive technology. This was a different half-hour telecast from the 1962 primetime episode on which Kilgallen can be seen and heard as one of the panelists. Game Show Network repeated that episode decades later.

The primetime show ended on May 22, 1967, with the daytime show ending on September 6, 1968. The latter was replaced by the expansions of Search for Tomorrow and Guiding Light, the last two remaining 15-minute programs on daytime television, to 30 minutes apiece, in a scheduling shuffle with The Edge of Night, The Secret Storm, and Art Linkletter's House Party. Like the primetime version, the daytime show's popularity underwent a steady decline toward the end of its run, as it faced two popular daytime dramas on ABC and NBC, General Hospital and Another World, respectively.

Metropole Orchestra leader Dolf van der Linden composed the show's first theme, "Peter Pan", used from 1956 to 1961. From 1961 to 1967, the show switched to a Bob Cobert-penned theme with a beat similar to "Peter Pan", and then to a Score Productions tune during its final CBS daytime season.

Most episodes of the original nighttime run of the series were preserved on black-and-white kinescope, along with a few color videotape episodes. Only a handful of shows remain from the CBS daytime series' first three years because of the then-common practice of wiping videotapes and reusing them due to their high cost and tight storage space. Many daytime episodes (including some in color) from 1966 to 1968 exist, including the color finale.

Reruns of the black-and-white kinescopes have been shown on Buzzr.

1969–1978, syndication
To Tell the Truth returned only a year later, in autumn of 1969, in first-run syndication. During the early years of its run, the syndicated Truth became a highly-rated component of stations' early-evening schedules after the Federal Communications Commission imposed the Prime Time Access Rule in 1971, opening up at least a half hour (a full hour, usually, on Eastern Time Zone stations) to fill with non-network fare between either the local or network evening newscast and the start of their networks' primetime schedules for the evening. Other stations found success running the program in place of a daytime network game or soap opera, or in the afternoon fringe time period between the end of network daytime programming at 4:30/3:30 Central and the evening newscasts.

Like the network editions that preceded it, the syndicated To Tell the Truth taped its episodes in New York for its entire run. Initially occupying the same studio space at the Ed Sullivan Theater that it had for the last few years of the network series, the show would eventually move operations to NBC’s Rockefeller Center studios in the early 1970s.

Each wrong vote in this version was worth $50 to the challengers; complete stumps of the entire panel won the challengers a total of $500. There were two games per episode, and there was often a live demonstration or video clip to illustrate the central character's story after many of the games.

The show was first released to local stations on September 8, 1969. A total of 1,715 episodes of this version were produced, with the series ending on September 7, 1978. Some markets that added the series after its initial 1969 release opted to carry the show for another season or two after 1978 in order to catch up on the episodes that had not aired in their viewing area.

To host the revival series, Goodson and Todman made a call to original host Bud Collyer; however, Collyer had been suffering from a series of health issues that led to his death on the day the 1969 series premiered, and he told them "I'm just not up to it." The next call they made was to Garry Moore, the former host of I've Got a Secret as well as the CBS variety series The Garry Moore Show. Moore had largely been away from television since his variety series was cancelled in 1964 (he left I've Got a Secret around the same time), but he decided the time was right to return and he accepted the offer to host the new series. Regular panelists included Orson Bean during the first year, Peggy Cass, Kitty Carlisle and Bill Cullen, who was also the designated substitute host whenever necessary. Many regulars from the original run appeared, including Tom Poston and Bert Convy. Semi-regulars during the 1968–73 time period included Gene Rayburn, Joe Garagiola, Tony Roberts and Nipsey Russell.

In late 1976, during the eighth season, Moore was diagnosed with esophageal cancer and left for the remainder of the season to deal with his illness. As he had done numerous times before, Bill Cullen became his replacement. As Cullen's time as host continued on, Mark Goodson noted how Cullen's serving as host, rather than as a panelist, hurt the chemistry he had shared with Cass and Carlisle. A decision was made to have Cullen return to the panel permanently and give semi-regular panelist Joe Garagiola the hosting position. Using a baseball term for "substitute," Garagiola stated that he was "pinch hitter" for Moore, who returned to the series for a farewell performance on the ninth-season premiere in 1977. Moore explained why he had left the program, then after presiding over one last game, announced his final retirement from television and handed the host position to Garagiola permanently. To Tell the Truth ended production at the end of the season.

Johnny Olson stayed with To Tell the Truth when it moved to syndication. He left in 1972, when he moved to Los Angeles to announce the Goodson-Todman revivals of The Price Is Right and I've Got a Secret. NBC staff announcer Bill Wendell succeeded Olson from 1972 to 1977, with Alan Kalter taking over during the final season. Don Pardo, also an NBC staff announcer, served as a backup to Wendell and Kalter.

To Tell the Truth used three distinctive sets throughout its nine-year syndicated run. The first, designed by Theodore Cooper and making heavy use of the psychedelic art styles popular in the period, was used for the first two seasons and the first four weeks of the third; those designs were muted somewhat with pastel shades on the second set used from that point through the first 30 weeks of the fourth season. The third—and longest-lived—set, which Cooper also designed, was a mostly-blue block motif with gold accents, and included a large on-stage representation of the show's new logo, which made use of stacking and interlocking letters, behind the panel. This set was used for the remainder of the run, and the logo would be reused on the future 1990 revival.

This version featured a lyrical, pop music-styled theme song written and composed by Score Productions chief Bob Israel and Truth producer Paul Alter, along with veteran theme composer Charles Fox; an instrumental, and orchestral, version would be used for the 1990 series.

The bulk of this version is intact. However, the current status of the first season is unknown, and is presumed to be lost to wiping. GSN has never rerun the first season of the show, and had always begun with the second season, in 1970. One episode from the first season exists in the UCLA Film and Television Archive. Buzzr began airing episodes from 1973 in October 2018.

On the October 5, 1973, episode, one of the challengers was Georg Olden, who disclosed that he was the graphic designer who created the "To Tell the Truth man" icon that was used during the 1956–1978 seasons.

1980–1981, syndication

On September 8, 1980, a new To Tell the Truth series premiered in syndication. The new series emanated once again from Rockefeller Center in New York, and Canadian TV personality Robin Ward served as the host, with Alan Kalter returning as announcer. A new theme and set were commissioned for this edition of Truth. Even though previous regulars Bill Cullen, Peggy Cass, and Kitty Carlisle made frequent appearances, there was no regular panel for this edition. The new Truth aired for one season in syndication, but it never recaptured the popularity of the original, and aired its final episode on June 12, 1981, with reruns airing until September 11, 1981.

Two games were played, and each wrong vote paid the challengers $100; $500 was paid if the entire panel had been fooled. No consolation prize was given if the entire panel correctly identified the subject.

After the second game, a new game called "One on One" was played with the four impostors from earlier. One fact had been purposely withheld from the panel about one of the impostors and it was up to the panelists to determine correctly to which of the impostors it applied. One at a time, each panelist would be given twenty seconds to question the impostor sitting directly across from him or her and would then say whether he or she believed the fact applied to that impostor. Wrong votes still paid $100, with $500 paid if the panel did not correctly determine to whom the fact pertained.

The 1980 edition of To Tell the Truth was a rarity in that it was still based in New York while nearly all television game show production had moved to California by this point. There was only one other game show in production during the run of this To Tell the Truth series that emanated from New York. The $50,000 Pyramid, which premiered at the midway point of the 1980-81 season, was the other; the series was taped at ABC’s Studio TV-15, the former Elysee Theater, on West 58th Street. These two would be the last non-cable productions to tape regularly in New York until 1999 when Who Wants to Be a Millionaire? premiered on ABC.

1990–1991, NBC
To Tell the Truth returned to NBC for a run that lasted just nine months from September 3, 1990, to May 31, 1991. Unlike previous versions that originated from New York, the 1990 version was taped at NBC's The Burbank Studios in California. The show's theme music was an orchestral remix of the 1969–78 theme (minus the lyrics), and the show utilized the block-letter logo from 1973 to 1978. All episodes of this series exist and have aired on GSN in reruns.

Actor Richard Kline hosted two pilot episodes with Charlie O'Donnell as announcer; one of these was accidentally aired as the premiere episode in the Eastern and Central time zones. The first regular host was A Current Affair reporter Gordon Elliott, with Burton Richardson announcing (O'Donnell served as his substitute). After eight weeks, a dispute with Elliott's former employers in Australia temporarily forced him off American television altogether; his replacement was then-frequent panelist Lynn Swann. Swann, the first African-American host of Truth, held that job for 14 weeks, until his job as a reporter for ABC Sports at the time forced him to leave. Alex Trebek was brought in as his replacement for the remainder of the run, at the same time he was hosting Classic Concentration on NBC and Jeopardy! in syndication. Mark Goodson filled in for two episodes Trebek missed when, during a taping, his wife Jean went into labor with their son Matthew.

The celebrity panelists for To Tell the Truth during this period included several of the 1970s panel stalwarts, including Kitty Carlisle, who appeared on a majority of the shows, taking the fourth and most upstage seat. The first seat, furthest downstage, saw Ron Masak and Orson Bean alternate on the panel for 34 of the 39 weeks the series was on air. The chair next to that was occupied by rotating guests, although voice actress Dana Hill appeared in the seat most often. The third chair most often featured David Niven Jr. as a panelist, although Masak and Bean would also sit there if both were to appear on the same program. Polly Bergen and Peggy Cass, who began appearing on the original series, would appear from time to time, and other frequent panelists included Vicki Lawrence, Cindy Adams, and Betty White. The panelists were introduced in twos, with the male panelists escorting the female panelists down the staircase, followed by the host. For one week, Monty Hall (who would later replace Bob Hilton as a permanent guest host on the 1990 version of Let's Make A Deal) sat in the first seat.

Two games were played with two sets of impostors. Any incorrect votes up to two paid $1,000. If three of the panelists had voted incorrectly, the players split $1,500. On the pilot, each incorrect vote earned $500. If the panel was fooled entirely, the players split $3,000.

After the second game, a new version of the "One on One" game from the 1980 series was played. A seventh civilian player was brought out with two stories, and a member of the studio audience was given an opportunity to win money by trying to figure out which of the two stories was true. Each panelist was given the opportunity to ask the contestant one question for each story, and after both stories had been presented the audience member chose which one he or she thought was the truth. After the choice was made, the contestant revealed the right answer and if the audience member came up with it, he or she won $500. If the contestant stumped the audience member, that player won $1,000.

Occasionally, celebrities whose faces were not well known would attempt to stump the audience during this part of the game. For example, Hank Ketcham, the creator of Dennis the Menace and a challenger on the original To Tell the Truth in May 1962, tried during the show's Christmas Day episode to convince an audience member that he was really the songwriter to "Rudolph the Red-Nosed Reindeer" (Johnny Marks had actually done this), but was unsuccessful in doing so.

2000–2002, syndication
The show then had a two-year run in syndication, starting in 2000, with John O'Hurley hosting, and Burton Richardson returning as the announcer. The series was again produced at NBC Studios in Burbank, California. Gary Stockdale supplied the music for this edition. In most markets, it was paired up with Family Feud, which was then hosted by Louie Anderson; O'Hurley would eventually join that program in 2006 and host it until 2010, when Steve Harvey took over.

Actor Meshach Taylor was the only regular to appear on every episode of this edition, while Paula Poundstone was a regular during the first season. Panelists appearing in at least six weeks of episodes included Brooke Burns, Dave Coulier, Brad Sherwood, Traci Bingham, Kim Coles, and Cindy Margolis. The show's website touted Coles and Burns as regulars for season two in place of Poundstone, though neither panelist was featured in every show that year. Kitty Carlisle appeared as a panelist for one episode in the first season, making her the only panelist to have appeared on all incarnations of this show to that point. It was Carlisle's final appearance in the franchise before her death in 2007.

This edition of To Tell the Truth brought back the audience vote that the original series had last used. Its vote was revealed after the panel had cast their votes, just before O'Hurley asked for the subject to identify himself or herself. Each incorrect vote paid $1,000, with a maximum of $5,000 available if the challengers managed to completely fool both the panel and the audience. (A tie in the audience vote or panel disqualification counted as a wrong vote, as they had in previous versions.) In the first several weeks of shows, a game that resulted in five incorrect votes was worth $10,000 for the challengers.

According to Steve Beverly's tvgameshows.net, this edition of Truth never received a rating higher than 1.8. It was cancelled on January 28, 2002, only 96 episodes into its second season. However, repeats continued to air through March 15, 2002. Episodes of this series have aired on GSN in reruns.

2016–present, ABC
ABC ordered six episodes of the show, hosted by Anthony Anderson, which taped in July 2015 and began airing on ABC on June 14, 2016. Anderson is the second African-American host of the franchise; the first was Lynn Swann on the short-lived 1990 NBC daytime version.

Also appearing on the new series was Doris Day Bowman, Anderson's mother, presented as the "scorekeeper." In some cases, where a panelist knows the central character or one of the impostors, Bowman also plays on their behalf. When Anderson's family appeared on Celebrity Family Feud, the behavior of "Mama Doris" was so outrageous that the producers approached Anderson about having her on To Tell The Truth. The first season also included a house band, Cheche and His Band of Liars, and David Scott as an offstage announcer.

The 2016 version of the show departed from prior versions in a number of ways. Episodes lasted 60 minutes rather than 30 minutes. Most contestants introduce themselves solely by claiming the central character's story (e.g., "I was a Bond girl" rather than "My name is ...") rather than by name; some panels have contestants of different genders. The questioning period is not split distinctly among the panelists, and Anderson and Bowman often participate in the questioning. Once in each episode, the two impostors from a single round participate in "Before You Go," a second round in which one is the central character and the other is again an impostor. Many episodes include a demonstration by one of the central characters. No mention is made of financial compensation for the impostors or the central characters, as the show presents itself mainly as a competition between the panelists.

Scoring 
Panelists receive 10 points for correctly identifying the central character, or 20 points for the final round (1 and 2 points in earlier episodes).

At the end of the episode, the losing panelist is subjected to some sort of minor humiliation; if panelists are tied, Bowman chooses the loser. In season one, the losing panelist was subjected to "Tweet a Lie," in which Anderson posted an embarrassing tweet to that panelist's Twitter account. Losing contestants are given a "dummy" crown. Starting with the August 11, 2019, episode, panelists who earn a perfect score win the "Doris Award," a gold-colored bust of Bowman. To date, three panelists have won the Doris Award: Oliver Hudson, on September 22, 2019; Deon Cole, on June 25, 2020; and Michael Strahan, on August 6, 2020. (Bowman had to play one round on Strahan's behalf, as he knew the central characters.)

Panelists 
The first season featured three regular panelists: Betty White, NeNe Leakes, and Jalen Rose; White has appeared on all three broadcast network versions of the show. In season two, the regular panelists were eliminated (as was the house band), although Rose still made occasional appearances.

To maintain social distancing during the COVID-19 pandemic, the sixth season reduced the number of panelists from four to three.

To date, four panelists have made ten or more appearances on the show: Sherri Shepherd (eleven), Nikki Glaser (ten), Joel McHale (ten), and Jalen Rose (ten, including six as a season one regular). Former host Alex Trebek was a panelist in a 2018 episode, making him the first host to appear on a subsequent version as a panelist.

Merchandise
A board game was released by Lowell in 1957.

During the run of the 2000 version, a single-player online game was offered by the short-lived website Uproar.com, and promoted by host John O'Hurley at the end of each episode.

A video slot machine game, based on the 1969 version, was released to American casinos nationwide by Bally Gaming Systems in 2002.

International versions

Notes

External links
 To Tell the Truth @ pearsontv.com
 To Tell the Truth (O'Hurley era) site
 To Tell the Truth (Anderson era) site
 To Tell the Truth on the Web offers a look at the various versions over the years. It also contains an episode guide for the 1990–91 and 2000–02 series.
 
 
 
 
 
 
 

American panel games
1950s American game shows
1956 American television series debuts
1960s American game shows
1968 American television series endings
1969 American television series debuts
1970s American game shows
1978 American television series endings
1980 American television series debuts
1980s American game shows
1981 American television series endings
1990 American television series debuts
1990s American game shows
1991 American television series endings
2000 American television series debuts
2000s American game shows
2002 American television series endings
2010s American game shows
2016 American television series debuts
2020s American game shows
American Broadcasting Company original programming
Black-and-white American television shows
CBS original programming
English-language television shows
First-run syndicated television programs in the United States
NBC original programming
Panel games
Television series by CBS Studios
Television series by Fremantle (company)
Television series by Mark Goodson-Bill Todman Productions
American television series revived after cancellation
1950s Australian game shows
1960s Australian game shows
1970s Australian game shows